Bedřich Smetana (1824–1884) was a Czech composer.

Smetana may also refer to:

 Ondřej Smetana (footballer) (born 1982), Czech footballer
 Ondřej Smetana (racing driver), Czech racing driver
 Smetana (dairy product), an East European version of sour cream 
 Zdenek Smetana. Czech animator and director